Batestown is an unincorporated community in Danville Township, Vermilion County, Illinois.

Geography

See also
 List of unincorporated communities in Illinois

References

External links
NACo

Unincorporated communities in Vermilion County, Illinois
Unincorporated communities in Illinois